The Uganda Buddhist Centre is a Buddhist Temple located Off-Entebbe Road, Bulega, Garuga, Entebbe, P.O. Box 898, Entebbe, Uganda

Quick stats

Leader/Title: Venerable Buddharakkhita
Ethnic Composition: Mostly Ugandans, seven Thais, one Burmese and forty-five Sri Lankans
Resident Monks: Venerable Buddharakkhita. Tradition: Theravada

History

The Uganda Buddhist Centre was founded by Venerable Buddharakkhita who is a Ugandan by nationality and is the first Buddhist monk in Uganda to introduce Buddhism into the country on April 10, 2005. It was created to introduce and preserve the Buddha's teachings within the context of African culture.

The Uganda Buddhist Centre is the first Buddhist Centre in Uganda. It is located on two acres of land at Bulega, Garuga, Entebbe (about 5 km off Kampala-Entebbe main road). The centre is open to all people who wish to cultivate peace, harmony, and happiness.

Mission

The Uganda Buddhist Centre aims to create an enduring home for the preservation and transmission of the Buddha's teachings by venerable and respectful teachers or masters established in Dhamma, and to continue to develop a landmark of Buddhist culture and teaching in Uganda and Africa as a whole.

References
 
 

2005 establishments in Uganda
21st-century Buddhist temples
Buddhist temples in Africa
Buildings and structures in Kampala
Religious buildings and structures in Uganda
Religious organizations established in 2005